Sphenomorphus scotophilus, the Selangor forest skink,  is a species of skink found in Thailand, Sumatra, and Malaysia.

References

scotophilus
Taxa named by George Albert Boulenger
Reptiles described in 1900